Katy Kirby is an American musician and singer-songwriter from Nashville, Tennessee.

Early life
Kirby grew up as an evangelical Christian in Spicewood, Texas, where she was homeschooled and listened primarily to worship music. She attended college at Belmont University, where she majored in English.

Career
Kirby began releasing music in 2018, with the EP Juniper. In May 2020, she shared a new recorded version of her song "Tap Twice".

In late 2020, she announced plans to release her debut album and, along with the announcement, released the single "Traffic!". The album, Cool Dry Place, came out on February 19, 2021, and became Stereogum's "Album of the Week". The album would eventually  be included in a number of yearend best-albums-of-2021 lists, including those by Paste, Our Culture Mag, and Consequence of Sound.

Discography

Studio albums
Cool Dry Place (2021, Keeled Scales)

EPs
Juniper (2018, Keeled Scales)

References

American indie rock musicians
Musicians from Nashville, Tennessee
Belmont University alumni
American women singer-songwriters
Singer-songwriters from Tennessee
Singer-songwriters from Texas